Lindinalva de Souza Rocha (born December 23), better known by her stage name Lili Rocha, is a Brazilian pop rock musician who started, her career with her first album, Me Deixa Sonhar (2003), in Italy.

Life and career 
Rocha was named the winner of the prominent Gabriela talent show in Ilhéus, Brazil. She then toured throughout Portugal, Italy, and Switzerland, later moving to Switzerland and entering the Accademia di Musica Italiana to study under Antonio Guglielmi, with whom she also recorded her first songs.

Rocha's albums contain songs in Portuguese, Spanish, and Italian. The first album, Me Deixa Sonhar (2003), sold over 80,000 records in Italy and modestly in Brazil. Rocha promoted this album by appearing in TV and live performances in São Paulo and Rio de Janeiro. The following year, Rocha released the album Recomeçar (2004) in Europe. Recomeçar was certified Gold in Italy with 40,000 copies sold. Rocha's third album, Amuleto (2007) was promoted with a concert tour of Italy and Spain. The tour resulted in a live album: Lili Rocha Live (2009). This album went Gold in Italy.

Concerts 
Rocha recently completed her first English album in the United States of America, giving concerts in New York City, Los Angeles, and Miami.

Discography 
 Me Deixa Sonhar (2003)
 Recomeçar (2004)
 Amuleto (2007)
 Lili Rocha Live (2009)
 Lili Rocha Rocks! (2010)

See also 
• Music of Brazil

Notes

External links
 Official Website

Year of birth missing (living people)
Living people
21st-century Brazilian women singers
21st-century Brazilian singers
Italian-language singers
Spanish-language singers of Brazil
English-language singers from Brazil
People from Bahia